Saliu Mustapha is a Nigerian politician and a member of the All Progressives Congress. He was the national deputy chairman of the Congress for Progressive Change, one of the defunct political parties that merged to form the All Progressives Congress.

He is equally the Founder and Chairman of Saliu Mustapha Foundation.

Early life and education
Mustapha was born on September 25, 1972 in Ilorin, Kwara state. He attended Bartholomew primary school in Zaria for his primary education and then proceeded to Command Secondary School in Kaduna for his secondary education. He studied mineral resources engineering at the Kaduna polytechnic.

Political career
Mustapha's political career started in the early 21st century when he became the first national publicity secretary of the Progressive Action Congress (PAC), a defunct political party that contested in the 2003 Nigerian presidential election. He became a member of the ANPP and was devoted to the presidential ambition of Muhammadu Buhari. In 2009, when a breakaway faction of the ANPP led by Muhammadu Buhari formed the Congress for Progressive Change, Mustapha became the national deputy chairman of the party. He hreld this position until the party merged and formed the All Progressives Congress. He contested for the national chairman position of the All Progressives Congress APC, the position which Sen. Adamu Abdullahi emerged as a consensus candidate of the party.

2018 Kwara state primary election 
He contested in the 2018 Kwara state's APC primary and got endorsed by the northern part of the state. He got disqualified from participating midway into the election. The National Working Committee of the party later apologized for the disqualification citing it as unauthorized.
In 2022, during the All Progressive Congress (APC) primaries in Kwara State, Mustapha emerged as the candidate to represent the party in Kwara Central senatorial election defeating the incumbent senator Ibrahim Yahaya Oloriegbe

References

Living people
Nigerian politicians
1972 births
People from Ilorin
Politicians from Kwara State